This team began as the West Plains Badgers, based in West Plains, Missouri in 1936. They were an affiliate of the St. Louis Cardinals in the Northeast Arkansas League.

The team moved to Caruthersville, Missouri on June 11, 1936, and became the Caruthersville Pilots. Despite playing in two cities under two names, they won the 1936 league title under manager Harrison Wickel. They won another championship in 1939 under manager Joseph Simmons.

On July 7, 1940, they moved again mid-season, this time to Batesville, Arkansas where they became the Batesville Pilots. After one more season in 1941, the team disbanded.

External links
Baseball Reference Batesville
Baseball Reference Caruthersville
Baseball Reference West Plains

Baseball teams established in 1940
Baseball teams disestablished in 1941
Professional baseball teams in Arkansas
Defunct baseball teams in Missouri
Defunct Northeast Arkansas League teams
St. Louis Cardinals minor league affiliates
1940 establishments in Arkansas
1941 disestablishments in Arkansas
Batesville, Arkansas
Defunct baseball teams in Arkansas